The list of shipwrecks in 2006 includes ships sunk, foundered, grounded, or otherwise lost during 2006.

January

16 January

28 January

31 January

February

1 February

2 February

3 February

9 February

18 February

23 February

March

5 March

9 March

12 March

21 March

22 March

23 March

26 March

30 March

April

27 April

May

6 May

12 May

17 May

29 May

June

7 June

12 June

26 June

July

7 July

13 July

15 July

18 July

22 July

26 July

Unknown date

August

1 August

3 August

11 August

12 August

28 August

September

6 September

17 September

October

3 October

9 October

10 October

19 October

24 October

November

1 November

2 November

4 November

28 November

December

8 December

30 December

Unknown date

References

External links
 Vessel Casualties & Pirates Database For Year 2006

2006
 
Ship